Ernst Octavianus Moltzer (1 May 1910 – 15 November 1941) was a sailor from the Netherlands, who represented his native country as  at the 1936 Summer Olympics in Kiel. Ernst, as crew member on the Dutch 6 Metre De Ruyter, took the 8th place with helmsman Joop Carp and fellow crew members: Ansco Dokkum, Kees Jonker and Herman Looman.

Personal life
Ernst Moltzer married in 1939 with countess Gertrude Anna Luise Therese Thusnelde von Sarnthein from Austria. He worked as a director of Lucas Bols. Moltzer was during World War II a 'Engelandvaarder' who died on the North Sea while trying to escape to England. His death certificate, dated 12 January 1951, states the date of death as 15 November 1941.

References

Sources
 
 
 
 

1910 births
1941 deaths
Sportspeople from Amsterdam
Dutch male sailors (sport)
Sailors at the 1936 Summer Olympics – 6 Metre
Olympic sailors of the Netherlands
Dutch civilians killed in World War II
People lost at sea
Engelandvaarders
20th-century Dutch people